Dobolii may refer to one of two places in Covasna County, Romania:

 Dobolii de Jos, a village in Ilieni Commune
 Dobolii de Sus, a village in Boroșneu Mare Commune